Wu Xiang (died 1644) was a general of the Ming dynasty and the father of Wu Sangui.

Biography
He was reprimanded by the Ming court in the 1630s for failing to join the fight against Nurhaci.  The ruling forces of the short-lived Shun dynasty of late Imperial China  took over his house, and Li Zicheng executed him.  This contributed to the Wu Sangui's decision to oppose that regime, which hastened the downfall of the already crumbling Ming Dynasty.

See also
 Zu Dashou

References

1644 deaths
Ming dynasty generals
Executed Ming dynasty people
17th-century executions by China
People from Yangzhou
Executed people from Jiangsu
Year of birth unknown
Generals from Jiangsu
People executed by China by decapitation